La gran sorpresa (English: The Great Surprise) is a Spanish-language reality television series produced by Univision Communications and Carnival Corporation & plc. The series premiered on Univision on 14 January 2018. The series then moved to UniMás for its second season, ending on 15 February 2019.

The series surprises several families when they embark on ships from Carnival Cruise Line, Princess Cruises and Holland America Line, and travel to exotic destinations. The series uses the cruise to reunite Latino families who have been separated due to illness, work issues, migration, among other circumstances.

The first season is hosted by Poncho de Anda and various television personalities, including, Karina Banda, Francisca Lachapel, and Ligia Uriarte. In season 2 Poncho de Anda is joined by Clarissa Molina.

Ratings 
 
| timeslot2         = Friday 8:00pm Friday 7:00pm 
| link2             = #Season 2 (2019)
| episodes2         = 6
| start2            = 
| end2              = 
| startrating2         = 0.20
| endrating2           = 0.23
| viewers2          = |2}} 
}}

Episodes

Series overview

Season 1 (2018)

Season 2 (2019)

Special

References

External links 
 

2018 American television series debuts
2019 American television series endings
Univision original programming